Lancaster RFC was a semi-professional rugby league club based in Lancaster, Lancashire, England.

The club first became members of the Northern Rugby Football Union (now Rugby Football League) in 1897, and joined the semi-professional ranks in the Lancashire Senior Competition in 1901–02. They played in the 2nd Division for the following three seasons. At the end of season 1904–05 the club left the league. The club was dissolved shortly afterwards.

History

Early days 
The original Lancaster RFC was formed in 1870. The club, along with Morecambe Bay neighbours Barrow, Ulverston and Millom joined the Northern Union in 1897, forming a 'North West Rugby League'. Around the turn of the century there were seven Northern Union clubs in and around the city.

During the early years the club had two prominent players who gained international caps. These were: "Gentleman" Jim Leytham, who joined Lancaster RFC in 1897, and John Pinch.

Northern Union 
Lancaster joined the ranks of the semi-professionals for the start of the 1901–02 season when they became members of the Northern Union. During that season they played in the Lancashire Senior Competition finishing in 10th position out of 17.

At the end of the 1901–02 season, the County Leagues elected 18 teams to join the new Division 2 (7 from Lancashire and 10 from Yorkshire and new member South Shields) with the existing second competition scrapped.

In the 1902–03 season, Lancaster joined the new 2nd Division, where they would stay for the next three seasons. In the first season in this division, (1902–03), they finished 11th out of 18 clubs.

In the following two seasons the club managed a mid-table position of 13th out of 18 and a lowly position of 12th out of 14 in 1903–04 and 1904–05 respectively. Lancaster dropped out of the league after the end of the season 1904–05 season. In each of the four seasons, comparing with the results of its near neighbours, Lancaster finished below Millom and Barrow and above Morecambe in every season.

Centenary match 

In 1904, Morecambe and Lancaster, very close neighbours, were drawn against each other in the first round of the Rugby League Challenge Cup.

100 years later the two clubs Morecambe (being represented by Heysham Atoms ARLFC) and Lancaster agreed to play a centenary commemorative match; the winner would be presented with the "Morecambe Bay State of Origin Trophy".
And so on Tuesday 11 May 2004, at Lancaster City AFC’s Giant Axe Stadium, Morecambe (playing in the traditional black and white hoops) beat Lancaster (in red and white hoops) 24–15.

Stadium 

Lancaster played at Quay Meadow, which was located behind the buildings on St Georges Quay. In 1905 the newly formed Lancaster Athletic FC played their first two matches at this stadium before moving to the Giant Axe Stadium.

Club league record 
The League positions for Lancaster for the three years in which they played semi-professional rugby league are given in the following table:

Heading Abbreviations

RL = Single Division; Pl = Games played; W = Win; D = Draw; L = Lose; PF = Points for; PA = Points against; Diff = Points difference (+ or -); Pts = League Points

% Pts = A percentage system was used to determine league positions due to clubs playing varying number of fixtures and against different opponents

League points: for win = 2; for draw = 1; for loss = 0.

Several fixtures and results 
The following are just a few of Lancaster fixtures during the three seasons (and other times) in which they played semi-professional rugby league:

Notes and comments 

 Folly Fields is the stadium used by Wigan at the time until 1901. They then became sub-tenants of Springfield Park See below - Note 3. 
 Lowerhouse Lane is the original site of the current ground used by Widnes. It was renamed Naughton Park in 1932 in honour of club secretary, Tom Naughton - and later renamed Halton Stadium after being completely rebuilt in 1997.
 Wigan became sub-tenants of Springfield Park, which they shared with Wigan United AFC, playing their first game there on 14 September 1901 at which a crowd of 4,000 saw them beat Morecambe 12–0, and the last game on 28 April 1902 when Wigan beat the Rest of Lancashire Senior Competition. A temporary ground was necessary to span the period between moving from Folly Fields and the new ground at Central Park being constructed.
 The original "Origin" game took place during the 1903/4 Rugby League Challenge Cup competition, where the two local teams played out an unusual 0–0 draw at Quay Meadow, only to be followed in the replay by a Lancaster win of 13 points to 4 at Moss Lane in Morecambe, approximately where Morrisons supermarket now stands. Lancaster progressed to the second round of the Cup, where they were defeated 8 points to nil by Keighley at Quay Meadow.

See also 

Jim Leytham
John Pinch
List of defunct rugby league clubs

References

External links 
Heysham Atoms ARLFC
Jim Lytham

Defunct rugby league teams in England
Sport in Lancaster, Lancashire
Rugby league teams in Lancashire
1870 establishments in England
1905 disestablishments in England
Rugby clubs established in 1870
English rugby league teams